Alex Fraser (25 December 1908 – 13 September 1983) was an Australian rules footballer who played for the St Kilda Football Club in the Victorian Football League (VFL).

Notes

External links 

1908 births
1983 deaths
Australian rules footballers from New South Wales
St Kilda Football Club players